The Halânga Power Station is a large thermal power plant located in Halânga, having 7 generation groups, 4 of 25 MW, 2 of 50 MW and 1 of 47 MW having a total electricity generation capacity of 247 MW. The American AES Corporation is also interested in constructing a new 400 MW unit at the station's site worth around US$1.6 billion.

See also

 List of power stations in Romania

References

External links
Description 

Coal-fired power stations in Romania